My Kinda Swing is a 1961 studio album by Ernestine Anderson, arranged by Ernie Wilkins. This was the third and final album that Anderson recorded for Mercury Records, and the last album that she recorded for seventeen years.

Track listing
 "My Kinda Love" (Louis Alter, Jo Trent)
 "Trouble is a Man" (Stanley Adams, Harold Adamson, eden ahbez)
 "See See Rider" (Ma Rainey, Lena Arant)
 "Moonlight in Vermont" (John Blackburn, Karl Suessdorf
 "Land of Dreams"
 "Black Moonlight"
 "All My Life"
 "Mound Bayou"
 "I'll Never Be The Same" (Matty Malneck, Frank Signorelli, Gus Kahn)
 "It Don't Mean a Thing (If It Ain't Got That Swing)" (Duke Ellington, Irving Mills)
 "Lazy Afternoon"
 "They Didn't Believe Me" (Jerome Kern, Herbert Reynolds)

Personnel
Ernestine Anderson - vocals
Clark Terry - trumpet
Hank Jones - piano
Yusef Lateef - flute, saxophone, oboe
Ernie Royal - trumpet
Frank Rehak - trombone
Kenny Burrell - guitar
Tate Houston - baritone saxophone
Mac Ceppos - violin
Art Davis - double bass
Willie Rodriguez - percussion
Charlie Persip - drums
Ernie Wilkins - arranger, conductor

References

1960 albums
Ernestine Anderson albums
Mercury Records albums
Albums arranged by Ernie Wilkins
Albums conducted by Ernie Wilkins